Allocasuarina ophiolitica is a species of flowering plant of the genus Allocasuarina native to Australia.

It is found in tall heath scrubland on serpentinite substrate in north eastern New South Wales

Distribution
It is found in a very restricted are of New South Wales: from Bralga Tops to Curricabark and Glenrock.

References

External links
  Occurrence data for Allocasuarina ophiolitica from The Australasian Virtual Herbarium

ophiolitica
Fagales of Australia
Flora of New South Wales
Dioecious plants